Bevan William Wilson (born 22 March 1956) is a former New Zealand rugby union player. A full-back, Wilson represented Otago at a provincial level, and was a member of the New Zealand national side, the All Blacks, from 1977 to 1979. He played 12 matches for the All Blacks including eight internationals.

References

1956 births
Living people
New Zealand international rugby union players
New Zealand rugby union players
Otago rugby union players
People educated at Dunstan High School
Rugby union fullbacks
Rugby union players from Alexandra, New Zealand